The 1979 Troy State Trojans football team represented Troy State University (now known as Troy University) as a member of the Gulf South Conference (GSC) during the 1979 NCAA Division II football season. Led by fourth-year head coach Charlie Bradshaw, the Trojans compiled an overall record of 6–3–1, with a mark of 4–1 in conference play, and finished second in the GSC.

Schedule

References

Troy State
Troy Trojans football seasons
Troy State Trojans football